Moravský Svätý Ján is a village and municipality in Senica District in the Trnava Region of western Slovakia.

History
In historical records the village was first mentioned in 1449. Under the names SZ.JANOS then ST.JOHANN IN UNGARN in the Austrian Empire. The villages name was until 1918 Morvaszentjános.

Geography
The municipality lies at an altitude of 168 metres and covers an area of 39.219 km2. It has a population of about 2074 people.

References

External links

http://www.statistics.sk/mosmis/eng/run.html

Villages and municipalities in Senica District